The following is the discography of American R&B/soul singer Keith Sweat.

Albums

Studio albums

Live albums

Compilation albums

Singles

As a lead artist

 1 – Airplay only
 2 – Airplay chart

Production discography

References

Rhythm and blues discographies
Discographies of American artists
Soul music discographies